Antelope Freeway is an album by American jazz guitarist Howard Roberts that was released in 1971 by Impulse! Records.

Reception
The Allmusic review gave the album three stars.

Track listing

Personnel
 Howard Roberts – guitar
 Mike Deasy – guitar
 Larry Knechtel, Pete Robinson, Mike Wofford – keyboards
 Robby Bruce – violin
 Max Bennett, Brian Garofalo – bass guitar
 John Guerin, Bob Morin – drums

References

Impulse! Records albums
Howard Roberts albums
1971 albums
Albums produced by Bill Szymczyk